Bantaskine is a park with woodlands  in Falkirk, Scotland that was formerly the Bantaskine Estate, a coal mining estate. The artist Mary Georgina Wade Wilson grew up there. The Battle of Falkirk Muir was fought nearby. It is also known as South Bantaskine. North Bantaskine, on the other side of the Union Canal, was an agricultural estate. It is listed as a historically significant archeological site by Historic Environment Scotland.

Etymology
The name may be from the Welsh words for a rise and a hollow, signifying a rise over a hollow.

History
The property was owned by a merchant operating in West Indian territories, Thomas Campbell Hagart. A brickworks was also on the property.

Wilson family
The Bantaskine estate was held by the Wilson coal magnate family. Coal magnate Robert Wilson established the estate as part of his coal mining empire. After his death, his 21-year-old son and future MP John Wilson (1815 - 1883) took over running the estate. He had eight daughters and a son. The stained glass windows from a mansion that once stood in the property are preserved at a local shopping center.

Robert Moffat stayed at the estate several times. It had substantial landscaping and gardens. Miss Wilson used them as a subject of her paintings.

Further reading
Moffat, John Smith, Robert Moffat and Mary Moffat. The Lives of Robert and Mary Moffat. p 394. Armstrong (1885). 
Ross, David R. ''On the Trail of Bonnie Prince Charlie. Edinburgh: Luath Press (2004).

References

External links
South Bantaskine Estate by Geoff Bailey from the Falkirk Local History Society

Parks in Falkirk (council area)